This is a list of Royal Australian Air Force aircraft squadrons. The Royal Australian Air Force (RAAF) was formed in 1921 and traces its lineage to the previous Australian Flying Corps that served during World War I. The list also includes those squadrons that were under Australian and British operational control during World War II, and squadrons that were operated jointly by the RAAF and the Netherlands East Indies.

Squadrons

RAAF units formed under Australian operational control

 No. 1 Squadron RAAF
 No. 2 Squadron RAAF
 No. 3 Squadron RAAF
 No. 4 Squadron RAAF
 No. 5 Squadron RAAF
 No. 6 Squadron RAAF
 No. 7 Squadron RAAF
 No. 8 Squadron RAAF
 No. 9 Squadron RAAF
 No. 10 Squadron RAAF
 No. 11 Squadron RAAF
 No. 12 Squadron RAAF
 No. 13 Squadron RAAF
 No. 14 Squadron RAAF
 No. 15 Squadron RAAF
 No. 20 Squadron RAAF
 No. 21 Squadron RAAF
 No. 22 Squadron RAAF
 No. 23 Squadron RAAF
 No. 24 Squadron RAAF
 No. 25 Squadron RAAF
 No. 26 Squadron RAAF
 No. 27 Squadron RAAF
 No. 28 Squadron RAAF
 No. 29 Squadron RAAF
 No. 30 Squadron RAAF
 No. 31 Squadron RAAF
 No. 32 Squadron RAAF
 No. 33 Squadron RAAF
 No. 34 Squadron RAAF
 No. 35 Squadron RAAF
 No. 36 Squadron RAAF
 No. 37 Squadron RAAF
 No. 38 Squadron RAAF
 No. 40 Squadron RAAF
 No. 41 Squadron RAAF
 No. 42 Squadron RAAF
 No. 43 Squadron RAAF
 No. 60 Squadron RAAF
 No. 66 Squadron RAAF
 No. 67 Squadron RAAF
 No. 68 Squadron RAAF –Reconnaissance based at Kojarena, WA – flew Avro Ansons
 No. 69 Squadron RAAF – Reconnaissance based at Georgina, WA – flew Avro Ansons
 No. 71 Squadron RAAF
 No. 73 Squadron RAAF
 No. 75 Squadron RAAF
 No. 76 Squadron RAAF
 No. 77 Squadron RAAF
 No. 78 Squadron RAAF
 No. 79 Squadron RAAF
 No. 80 Squadron RAAF
 No. 82 Squadron RAAF
 No. 83 Squadron RAAF
 No. 84 Squadron RAAF
 No. 85 Squadron RAAF
 No. 86 Squadron RAAF
 No. 87 Squadron RAAF
 No. 88 Squadron RAAF
 No. 92 Squadron RAAF
 No. 93 Squadron RAAF
 No. 94 Squadron RAAF
 No. 99 Squadron RAAF
 No. 100 Squadron RAAF
 No. 102 Squadron RAAF
 No. 107 Squadron RAAF
 No. 292 Squadron RAAF
 RAAF Squadron Berlin Air Lift
 Fighter Squadron RAAF
 Rescue and Communication Squadron RAAF
 Seaplane Squadron RAAF
 RAAF University Squadrons

RAAF Empire Air Training Scheme Squadrons

 No. 450 Squadron RAAF
 No. 451 Squadron RAAF
 No. 452 Squadron RAAF
 No. 453 Squadron RAAF
 No. 454 Squadron RAAF
 No. 455 Squadron RAAF
 No. 456 Squadron RAAF
 No. 457 Squadron RAAF
 No. 458 Squadron RAAF
 No. 459 Squadron RAAF
 No. 460 Squadron RAAF
 No. 461 Squadron RAAF
 No. 462 Squadron RAAF
 No. 463 Squadron RAAF
 No. 464 Squadron RAAF
 No. 466 Squadron RAAF
 No. 467 Squadron RAAF

Joint RAAF-Netherlands East Indies Squadrons

 No. 18 (NEI) Squadron (bomber)
 No. 19 (NEI) Squadron (transport/communications)
 No. 119 (NEI) Squadron (bomber)
 No. 120 (NEI) Squadron (fighter)

See also

 List of Australian Fleet Air Arm flying squadrons
 List of Australian Army aviation units
 List of Royal Australian Air Force independent aircraft flights
 List of Royal Australian Air Force wings

References

Further reading

External links
RAAF Museum: Brief histories of all RAAF Squadrons

Australian Air Force aircraft squadrons

Royal Australian Air Force lists